KPMF-LD (channel 26) is a low-power television station licensed to Paragould, Arkansas, United States, within the Jonesboro media market, though it actually serves the Memphis, Tennessee market from the WATN/WLMT transmitter off Brief Road in the Brunswick section of unincorporated northeast Shelby County. Owned by HC2 Holdings, the station has a primary affiliation with beIN Sports Xtra. It is presently not carried on any cable or satellite providers.

History 
Although granted a construction permit in 2012 by the Federal Communications Commission (FCC), the station was silent until 2016. The original call sign was K26MF-D from 2012 until January 2016, when the call sign was changed to the current KPMF-LD.

While the first three subchannels remain dark, KPMF signed on virtual channel 26.4 in May 2016 as an affiliate of The Country Network (formerly Zuus Country). The first three subchannels could go on the air later as affiliates of other multicast digital networks such as Buzzr, Bounce TV or Doctor Television Channel. Sister station K30MF-D could take an Antenna TV affiliation for the Jonesboro market. DTV America owned one other construction permit for K38OR-D, which was rumored to become an over-the-air relaunch of "KJOS", the area's cable-exclusive affiliate of The CW via The CW Plus; however, K38OR-D's license was cancelled by the FCC on November 16, 2017. On July 25, 2018, KAIT announced it would be bringing CW programming (via their national CW+ service) into the Jonesboro market through a third subchannel, starting on September 1, 2018; therefore, KAIT-DT3 (not K38OR-D) is the successor of the cable-exclusive "KJOS".

In late June 2016, the station's first three subchannels went on the air as affiliates of Katz Broadcasting-operated Escape and Laff on the first two subchannels. Also, Sony Pictures Television's GetTV movie network and FremantleMedia-owned Buzzr came on the air on channels 26.3 and 26.4, respectively. Buzzr replaced The Country Network. Channels 26.5 and 26.6 also went on the air as Sonlife Broadcasting Network and QVC affiliates.

Escape and Laff were replaced by different networks in October 2016. GetTV was moved up to KPMF-LD2, and Comet, which is a joint venture between the MGM studio and Sinclair Broadcast Group was launched onto the LD3 subchannel, with Buzzr remaining on the LD4 subchannel. The main subchannel became a MyNetworkTV affiliate, with programming from the Doctor Television Channel being broadcast outside of MyNetworkTV's programming schedule. If the station launched on a transmitter within the home market of its city of license, KPMF would have been the Jonesboro market's first MyNetworkTV affiliate. For a time, Memphis also had access to a second MyNetworkTV affiliate, WLMT, the CW affiliate in Memphis, which ran MyNetworkTV programming on its second subchannel along with most of the MeTV programming schedule; however, MyNetworkTV programming on that sub-channel was eventually dropped, leaving KPMF as the sole MyNetworkTV affiliate in Memphis until 2021. Jonesboro eventually gained its own MyNetworkTV affiliate on September 3, 2018 when the LD3 subchannel of low-powered dual Fox/CBS affiliate KJNB-LD/KJNE-LD picked up the programming service to supplement its own MeTV programming.

In January 2017, KPMF's DrTV affiliation on the main subchannel was replaced with AMGTV and, by 2018, Quest. However, MyNetworkTV remained on the main channel on weeknights until 2021, when both affiliations were replaced with beIN Sports Xtra on the main subchannel, resulting in MyNetworkTV moving back to WLMT as a secondary affiliation on its main subchannel, while WATN-TV launched a sixth digital subchannel with Quest. In 2018, the station moved from a transmitter site across the Mississippi River on a cell tower on Washington Street in downtown Marion, Arkansas, to the Tegna tower in Brunswick.

At an unknown time, Comet was replaced by infomercials (which also aired in a new seventh subchannel).

Subchannels
The station's digital signal is multiplexed:

References

External links
DTV America 

Quest (American TV network) affiliates
GetTV affiliates
Buzzr affiliates
Innovate Corp.
Low-power television stations in the United States
PMF-LD
2016 establishments in Arkansas
Television channels and stations established in 2016